The 1958 Queen's Birthday Honours in New Zealand, celebrating the official birthday of Elizabeth II, were appointments made by the Queen on the advice of the New Zealand government to various orders and honours to reward and highlight good works by New Zealanders. They were announced on 12 June 1958.

The recipients of honours are displayed here as they were styled before their new honour.

Order of Saint Michael and Saint George

Companion (CMG)
 John Cawte Beaglehole – of Wellington. For services in the fields of historical research and literature.
 James Roberts – secretary of the New Zealand Waterside Workers' Federation and the Alliance of Labour.

Order of the British Empire

Knight Commander (KBE)
Civil division
 Charles Ritchie Burns   – of Wellington. For services to medicine.
 Frederick Horace Smirk  – professor of medicine at the University of Otago.

Military division
 Major-General William George Gentry  – Generals' List (Retired), New Zealand Army.
 Major-General Keith Lindsay Stewart  – Generals' List (Retired), New Zealand Army.

Commander (CBE)
Civil division
 Gilbert Edward Archey  – director of the Auckland Institute and Museum.
 James Leggat – headmaster of the Christchurch Boys' High School.
 Campbell Percy McMeekan – superintendent of the Animal Research Station at Ruakura.
 David Miller – an entomologist; director of the Cawthron Institute, Nelson.

Military division
 Air Commodore Charles Campbell Hunter  – Royal New Zealand Air Force.

Officer (OBE)
Civil division
 Geoffrey Thomas Alley – director of the National Library Service.
 Estelle Beere – of Wellington; a teacher of dancing for many years.
 The Reverend Colin Douglas Charles Caswell – of Auckland. For services to the community.
 Ernest Charles Empson – president of the New Zealand Registered Music Teachers' Association.
 Trevor Hatherton – Geophysics Division, Department of Scientific and Industrial Research, Wellington.
 Joseph Holmes Miller – deputy leader of the New Zealand Trans-Antarctic Expedition.
 Cecily Mary Wise Pickerill  – of Wellington. For services in the field of plastic surgery.
 Thomas Athol Rafter – director of the Dominion Physical Laboratory.
 William Stanley Norman Rennie – president of the Electrical Supply Authorities Association and chairman of the Wanganui Power Board.
 Emily Elizabeth Stephens – of Auckland. For services to education.
 John Weeks – an artist, of Auckland.

Military division
 Lieutenant-Colonel Warren John Boyd   – Royal New Zealand Army Medical Corps (Territorial Force).
 Lieutenant-Colonel (temporary) Raymond Francis Smith  – Royal New Zealand Infantry Corps (Territorial Force).
 Wing Commander Arnold Eric Cockburn – Royal New Zealand Air Force.

Member (MBE)
Civil division
 Vincent Aspey – of Wellington. For services to music, especially as leader of the National Orchestra.
 Ralph Ewart Barley . For services in the field of local government and community work in the Hawke's Bay area.
 Kathleen Buckle. For services to the community in North Auckland.
 William Carran – chief superintendent, New Zealand Police Force.
 Percy William Jones Cockerill – of Timaru. For services to the community.
 Agnes Emily Aurora Faulkner  – of Tauranga. For social welfare services.
 Kathleen Janet Ford – principal of the Burwood Girls' Training Centre, Christchurch.
 Malama Vaiolae Head – of Niue. For services to education.
 Violet Blanche Rollings  – mayoress of Onehunga.
 Henry Valentine Horlor . For services to the community in local-body affairs in Lower Hutt.
 Agnes Mary Kearns – of Palmerston North. For services to nursing.
 Ngarangi Putiputi Te Kura Kohere – of Dannevirke. For services to nursing.
 Captain Raymond Arthur Parker – Merchant Marine. For services to the community of the North Shore area, Auckland.
 James Malcolm Patrick – chairman of the King Edward Technical College.
 Ellen Alma Rose – lately matron of the public hospital, Waipukurau.
 Oscar Silbery . For services to the community in local-body affairs in the Petone area.
 Thomas Stewart Spencer – of Bluff. For services to the Māori people.

Military division
 Lieutenant (SD) Trevor Harry Wickman – Royal New Zealand Navy.
 Warrant Officer Class I George Henry – Royal New Zealand Artillery.
 Major William Aitchison Driscoll McComb  – Royal New Zealand Army Service Corps (Territorial Force).
 Major Frank Dupree McWha – Royal New Zealand Electrical and Mechanical Engineers.
 Warrant Officer Class I Cecil Max Schwass – New Zealand Regiment.
 Flight Lieutenant Edward Lunn  – Royal New Zealand Air Force.
 Flight Lieutenant Francis Davitt Mandival Moran – Royal New Zealand Air Force Reserve.

Companion of the Imperial Service Order (ISO)
 Leslie Issott Grange – director of New Zealand Geological Survey.

British Empire Medal (BEM)
Civil division
 Alonzo George Edgar Beal – senior sergeant, New Zealand Police Force, Bluff.
 John Richard Lucas – night duty officer, Mount Eden Jail, Department of Justice, Auckland.
 William Smith – second-in-charge of store activities, Naval Store Department, HMNZ Dockyard, Auckland.

Military division
 Mechanician 1st Class Roy Alphonsus Berwick – Royal New Zealand Navy.
 Petty Officer Walter John Douglas – Royal New Zealand Navy.
 Chief Electrical Artificer Thomas Gaylor – Royal New Zealand Navy.
 Chief Radio Electrician Peter David Mulgrew – Royal New Zealand Navy.
 Engine Room Artificer Class II Frank Desmond Rastrick – Royal New Zealand Naval Volunteer Reserve.
 Staff-Sergeant Ramon Tinsley – New Zealand Regiment.
 Flight Sergeant Richard James Ruscoe – Royal New Zealand Air Force.
 Sergeant William Rink – Royal New Zealand Air Force.
 Sergeant Laurence Walter Tarr – Royal New Zealand Air Force.

Air Force Cross (AFC)
 Squadron Leader John Richard Claydon – Royal New Zealand Air Force.
 Squadron Leader Keith Bishop Smith – Royal New Zealand Air Force.

Queen's Police Medal (QPM)
 Percy James Nalder  – assistant commissioner of the New Zealand Police Force.

References

Birthday Honours
1958 awards
1958 in New Zealand
New Zealand awards